The Tuscan regional election of 2015 took place on 31 May 2015.

Electoral system
Tuscany uses its own legislation of 2014 to elect its Regional Council. The councillors are elected in provincial constituencies by proportional representation using the D'Hondt method. Florence constituency is further divided into 4 sub-constituencies. Preferential voting is allowed: a maximum of two preferences can be expressed for candidates of the same party list and provided the two chosen candidates are of different gender.

In this system parties are grouped in alliances, supporting a candidate for the post of President of Tuscany. The candidate receiving at least 40% of the votes is elected to the post and his/her list (or the coalition) is awarded a majority in the Regional Council. If no candidate gets more than 40% of the votes, a run-off is held fourteen days after, with only the two top candidates from the first round allowed. The winning candidate is assured a majority in the Regional Council.

Council apportionment
According to the official 2011 Italian census, the 40 Council seats which must be covered by proportional representation are so distributed between Tuscan provinces. The number of seats to be assigned in each province is the following:

The Province of Florence is further divided into smaller electoral colleges.

Parties and candidates

Results

See also
2015 Italian regional elections

Notes

2015 elections in Italy
2015 regional election
2015
May 2015 events in Italy